Dodekanisos Seaways is a Greek ferry company operating from the island of Rhodes to smaller Dodecanese islands and islands of the Northeastern Aegean. Its itineraries cover 17 island destinations: Rhodes, Symi, Panormitis Symi, Kos, Kalymnos, Leros, Lipsi, Patmos, Agathonisi, Kastellorizo, Halki, Tilos, Nisyros, Arkoi, Samos, Ikaria and Fourni. Dodekanisos Seaways owns two catamaran speedboats, the Dodekanisos Express and the Dodekanisos Pride as well as the conventional ship Panagia Skiadeni. Dodekanisos Seaways was awarded as the Best Shipping Company of the year 2015, by Lloyd's List, in the context of the Greek Shipping Awards 2015, while among others, it was awarded praise by the Greek Red Cross, the Municipality of Rhodes and the Central Port Authority of Rhodes.

History 
Dodekanisos Seaways was founded in 1999, by George Spanos, in Rhodes. It started with a high-speed catamaran, the Dodekanisos Express, which was built for the company at the Norwegian shipyard Båtservice Mandal AS and delivered in 2000. In 2005, Dodekanisos Seaways built the second high-speed catamaran, the Dodekanisos Pride and in 2011 it bought Panagia Skiadeni.

Fleet
As of October 2018, Dodekanisos Seaways operates the following fleet.

Routes
 Rhodes-Symi-Kos-Kalymnos-Leros-Lipsi-Patmos-Agathonisi-Arkoi-Ikaria-Fournoi-Samos (Dodekanisos Pride)

 Rhodes-Chalki-Tilos-Nisyros-Kos-Kalymnos (Dodekanisos Express)
 Rhodes-Symi (Panagia Skiadeni)

 Rhodes-Kastellorizo (Dodekanisos Pride)

References

Ferry companies of Greece
Companies based in the South Aegean
Transport companies established in 1999
Companies based in Rhodes
Greek companies established in 1999